Peristernia carotiana is a species of sea snail, a marine gastropod mollusk in the family Fasciolariidae, the spindle snails, the tulip snails and their allies.

Description

Distribution
This species is found in the Indian Ocean off Mauritius

References

 Snyder M.A. & Callomon P. (2010) Tapparone-Canefri’s type material of fasciolariid Gastropoda (Mollusca) at the Genoa Natural History Museum. Proceedings of the Academy of Natural Sciences of Philadelphia 159: 31–38. page(s): 32

External links
 Tapparone Canefri, C. (1881). Glanures dans la faune malacologique de l'Ile Maurice. Catalogue de la famille des Muricidés. 100 pp., 2 pls.

Fasciolariidae
Gastropods described in 1880